is a passenger railway station located in the town of Ōtoyo, Nagaoka District, Kōchi Prefecture, Japan. It is operated by JR Shikoku and has the station number "D29".

Lines

Layout
The station consists of an island platform serving two tracks. The station building by the side of the tracks is unstaffed and serves as a waiting room. A pedestrian footbridge connects the station building with the island platform and also leads to a side platform (not used for passengers) serving a siding. There is a shelter on the island platform for waiting passengers.

Adjacent stations

History
At this time the station was operated by Japanese Government Railways, later becoming Japanese National Railways (JNR). With the privatization of JNR on 1 April 1987, control of the station passed to JR Shikoku.

Surrounding area
National Route 32 - runs parallel to the tracks on the other side of the station building. It is possible to access the station platforms and building from here as there is an entrance to the footbridge. 
National Route 439 - crosses the track and forms a junction with National Route 32 just southwest of the station.

See also
 List of Railway Stations in Japan

References

External links

JR Shikoku timetable 

Railway stations in Kōchi Prefecture
Railway stations in Japan opened in 1934
Ōtoyo, Kōchi